Massee is the surname of the following people:

George Edward Massee (1845–1917), English mycologist, plant pathologist, and botanist
J. C. Massee (1871–1965), American Christian fundamentalist
May Massee (1881–1966), American children's book editor
Michael Massee (1952–2016), American actor

See also
Masse (disambiguation)
Massee Lane Gardens
Massey (disambiguation)
Massie (disambiguation)